Nritoday, which is subtitled The Magazine for Non-Resident Indians, explores not only individuals but also focuses on the works of Indian businessmen, IT professionals, musicians and performing artists in the United States. It is an English language monthly newsmagazine. Nritoday has been published in New York City since August 1994 by the TPT Groups inc., whose founding editor is Venugopal.

References

External links
Nri Today Official Site
Thanks NRI Today

Asian-American magazines
Magazines established in 1994
Magazines published in New York City
Monthly magazines published in the United States
nritoday